Anderson Garcia (born March 23, 1981) is a Dominican former professional baseball relief pitcher, who played one game in Major League Baseball (MLB) for the  Philadelphia Phillies.

Career
Garcia was signed as a non-drafted free agent by the New York Yankees in May . In July , he was traded along with pitchers Jason Anderson and Ryan Bicondoa to the New York Mets for closer Armando Benítez. Though primarily a starting pitcher while in the Yankees organization, the Mets organization used him almost exclusively as a reliever. Garcia was promoted to the Mets roster in May , but was quickly sent back to Norfolk and never actually appeared in a game for the team. In August 2006, he was placed on waivers by the Mets and claimed by the Baltimore Orioles. He was subsequently claimed by the Philadelphia Phillies in December.

In February , the Seattle Mariners claimed Garcia on waivers from the Phillies. Garcia was released on July 9, 2008.

External links

1981 births
Living people
Battle Creek Yankees players
Binghamton Mets players
Bowie Baysox players
Capital City Bombers players
Dominican Republic expatriate baseball players in Canada
Dominican Republic expatriate baseball players in the United States
Estrellas Orientales players
Gulf Coast Mets players
Gulf Coast Yankees players
High Desert Mavericks players

Major League Baseball players from the Dominican Republic
Major League Baseball pitchers
Norfolk Tides players
Ottawa Lynx players
Philadelphia Phillies players
Reading Phillies players
Rio Grande Valley WhiteWings players
Staten Island Yankees players
St. Lucie Mets players
West Tennessee Diamond Jaxx players